Gülşah Kıyak (born in 1989) is a Turkish female wushu practitioner competing in the Sanshou 60 kg division. She is a member of the Altınayak Youth and Sports Club in Esenler, Istanbul, where she is coached by İrfan Doruk. Since 2008, she is a student of Sports and Physical Education at the Uludağ University in Bursa.

Early years
Gülşah Kıyak was born 1989 in Ankara as the youngest child of the family. Her parents moved in 1999 to Istanbul. Her father Hikmet Kıyak enrolled her upon an advice from a friend of him at martial arts training. So, she began practicing wushu in 2000 at the age of eleven in a small sport center in Esenler, Istanbul. Five years later in 2005, she won her first official champion title in the Istanbul tournament.

Achievements
Kich boxing
 (63 kg) 2005 National Youth Kick boxing Championships, Çorum, Turkey

Wushu
 2007 National Junior Wushu Championships -  July 13–15, 2007, Gümüşhane, Turkey
 3rd European Junior Wushu Championships - October 4–7, 2007, Warsaw, Poland
 (60 kg) 12th European Wushu Championships -  March 6–13, 2008, Warsaw, Poland
 (60 kg) 2009 National Wushu Championships - July 24–26, 2009, Safranbolu, Turkey
 (60 kg) 10th World Wushu Championships -  October 25–29, 2009, Toronto, Canada
 (60 kg) 13th European Wushu Championships -  March 6–13, 2010, Antalya, Turkey
 (60 kg) 5th Sanda World Cup -  December 16–18, 2010, Chongqing, China

Awards
2008 Best female wushu practitioner (Awarded by EWuF at the 12th EWuC)

References

1989 births
Sportspeople from Ankara
Living people
Turkish sanshou practitioners